Baby is the 2009 release from the Canadian indie band The Burning Hell, released on the Canadian independent record label weewerk in the spring of 2009.

Track listing
All songs by Mathias Kom

"Old World" 
"Dancer/Romancer"
"Everybody Needs a Body (To Be Somebody)" 
"The Things That People Make, Pt. 2" 
"Mosquito" 
"Grave Situation, Pt. 3" 
"Precious Island" 
"Animal Hides" 
"The Berlin Conference"
"When the World Ends"
"Everything Will Probably Be OK" (hidden track)

References

2009 albums
The Burning Hell albums